Eucelatoria aurata is a species of tachinid flies in the genus Eucelatoria of the family Tachinidae.

Distribution
Brazil, Venezuela.

External links

Exoristinae
Diptera of South America
Insects described in 1927
Taxa named by Charles Henry Tyler Townsend